The Southern Theater Command Air Force is the air force under the Southern Theater Command. Its headquarters is in Guangzhou, Guangdong.

History 
On 1 February 2016, the founding meeting of the Southern Theater Command Air Force was held at the August First Building in Beijing, China.

Functional department 
 General Staff
 Political Work Department
 Logistics Department
 Disciplinary Inspection Committee

Direct units

Bases

List of leaders

Commanders

Political commissars

Chief of staffs

References 

Southern Theater Command
Air force units and formations of the Chinese People's Liberation Army
Military units and formations established in 2016
2016 establishments in China